The 1998 English cricket season was the 99th in which the County Championship had been an official competition. Leicestershire won the title for the second time in three seasons while Lancashire performed the one day double. In two Test series, England defeated South Africa 2–1 and lost 1–0 to Sri Lanka.

Honours
County Championship - Leicestershire
NatWest Trophy - Lancashire
Sunday League - Lancashire
Benson & Hedges Cup - Essex
Minor Counties Championship - Staffordshire
MCCA Knockout Trophy - Devon
Second XI Championship - Northamptonshire II 
Wisden - Ian Austin, Darren Gough, Muttiah Muralitharan, Arjuna Ranatunga, Jonty Rhodes

Test series

South African tour

Sri Lanka tour

County Championship

Sunday League

NatWest Trophy

Benson & Hedges Cup

Leading batsmen

Leading bowlers

References

External sources
 CricketArchive – season and tournament itineraries

Annual reviews
 Playfair Cricket Annual 1999
 Wisden Cricketers' Almanack 1999

English cricket seasons in the 20th century
English Cricket Season, 1998
Cricket season